Chatton is an unincorporated community in Houston Township, Adams County, Illinois, United States. Chatton is north of Golden.

A post office called Chatton was established in 1863, and remained in operation until 1903. The name Chatton is a corruption of the last name of B. I. Chatten.

References

Unincorporated communities in Adams County, Illinois
Unincorporated communities in Illinois